Briot may refer to:

People
 Charles Auguste Briot (1817–1882), French mathematician
 Isaac Briot (1585–1670), French engraver and draughtsman
Maryvonne Briot (born 1959), French politician
 Nicholas Briot (1579–1646), French coin engraver, medallist and mechanical engineer

Places
 Briot, Oise, France